LGBT Danmark – Landsforeningen for bøsser, lesbiske, biseksuelle og transpersoner is a lobby for gays, lesbians, bisexuals and transgender people. The association was founded in 1948 as Circle of 1948 (Kredsen af 1948). The current name has been in use since November 2009; its former name, in use for 24 years prior, was Landsforeningen for Bøsser og Lesbiske, Forbundet af 1948, shortened to LBL. The Norwegian Organisation for Sexual and Gender Diversity originated as the Norwegian branch of the Danish group.

History
The association's founder and first chairman was Axel Lundahl Madsen, later Axel Axgil, who held the chairman position until 1952. Inspired by the United Nations' Universal Declaration of Human Rights, in Paris on 10 December 1948, he, his partner Eigil Eskildsen (later also Axgil) and other friends founded the association under the name Kredsen af 1948. In 1949 the name became Forbundet af 1948, F-48 for short. By 1951, F-48's membership had grown to 1,339. In 2009 the current name was introduced.

The couple also published the first issue of an illegal paper with homoerotic content, Vennen (The Friend), in 1949, and continued to publish from 1959 until 1970.

Aims
For the majority of its existence, LGBT Denmark has been a lobby for gays and lesbians, but since 2002 bisexuals and since 2008 transgender people have also been officially included.

LGBT Denmark's aim is to work for gay, lesbian, bisexual and transgender people's political, social, cultural and workplace equality at every level of society. The association seeks to work against discrimination and to function as a dedicated lobby for the purpose of influencing lawmakers, for example in areas such as marriages, adoption, the artificial insemination of lesbians, and rights for transpersons.

From January 1954 onwards the association published a magazine, Panbladet. Since December 2007 the publication has been on temporary hold due to financial problems.

On 22 June 1983, Copenhagen's gay radio station Radio Rosa was founded by the LBL. It later operated independently of the association, but closed down in 2010.

Chairpersons throughout the years
 1948–1952: Axel Axgil
 1952–1958: Holger Bramlev
 1958–1970: Erik Jensen
 1970–1978: Per Kleis Bønnelycke
 1978–1986: Henning Jørgensen
 1986–1989: Bruno Pedersen
 1989–1994: Else Slange
 1994: Susan Peters
 1994: Søren Baatrup
 1994–1998: Søren Laursen
 1998–2002: Bent Hansen
 2002–2005: Peter Andersen
 2005–2007: Mikael Boe Larsen
 2007: Patricia Duch 
 2007–2008: Maren Granlien 
 2008: Kristoffer Petterson
 2008–2011: HC Seidelin
 2011–2014: Vivi Jelstrup
 2014–2017: Søren Laursen
 2017–2019: Peder Holk Svendsen
 2019–present: Ask Ulrich Petersen

See also

LGBT rights in Denmark
Lambda
Norwegian National Association for Lesbian and Gay Liberation
List of LGBT rights organizations

References

External links
 LGBT Danmark
 Panbladet
 Radio Rosa

LGBT history in Denmark
LGBT political advocacy groups in Denmark
1948 establishments in Denmark
1940s in LGBT history
Organizations established in 1948